The 2020 season was Central Sparks' first season, in which they competed in the 50 over Rachael Heyhoe Flint Trophy following reforms to the structure of women's domestic cricket in England. The side finished second in the North Group of the competition, winning three of their six matches but failing to qualify for the final.

After the ending of the Women's Cricket Super League in 2019, the ECB announced the beginning of a new "women's elite domestic structure". Eight teams were included in this new structure, with Central Sparks being one of the new teams, representing the West Midlands. Due to the impact of the COVID-19 pandemic, only the Rachael Heyhoe Flint Trophy was able to take place. Central Sparks were captained by Evelyn Jones and coached by Lloyd Tennant, and played their home matches at Edgbaston and New Road.

Squad
Central Sparks' squad is listed below. Age given is at the start of Central Sparks' first match of the season (29 August 2020).

Rachael Heyhoe Flint Trophy

North Group

 Advanced to the Final.

Fixtures

Statistics

Batting

Bowling

Fielding

Wicket-keeping

References

Central Sparks seasons
2020 in English women's cricket